Meshal Khalaf (born 27 September 1994) is a Saudi football player. He currently plays for Al-Jubail.

External links
 

1994 births
Living people
Saudi Arabian footballers
Al Batin FC players
Al-Tadamon SC (Saudi Arabia) players
Al-Tai FC players
Al Jandal Club players
Al-Shoulla FC players
Al-Riyadh SC players
Arar FC players
Al-Jubail Club players
Saudi First Division League players
Saudi Professional League players
Saudi Second Division players
Saudi Third Division players
Saudi Fourth Division players
Association football defenders